Keatley is an unincorporated community in Douglas Rural Municipality No. 436, Saskatchewan, Canada. The community is located 60 kilometers northeast of the city of North Battleford, Saskatchewan.

See also

 List of communities in Saskatchewan

References

Douglas No. 436, Saskatchewan
Unincorporated communities in Saskatchewan
Ghost towns in Saskatchewan
Division No. 16, Saskatchewan